Ras Tanura Airport is a small airport in the western side of Ras Tanura city in the Eastern Province of Saudi Arabia. The airport occupies an area of 1.9 km2, surrounded by residential areas and oil pipelines.

Overview
The airport is owned and operated by the Saudi Arabian oil company Saudi Aramco for logistics operations. The airport was used for Aramco jets and helicopters until the completion of the nearby King Fahd International Airport in Dammam, when the company moved its aviation operations from Ras Tanura and Dhahran to Dammam. Currently the airport is solely used as heliport to provide logistics to nearby offshore rigs in the Persian Gulf.

Facilities
The airport has one runway that is 2,150 meters long and 30 meters wide with lights and ILS support. There are two parking/gate for medium-sized jets, and several helipads can be found in the airport.

Airports in Saudi Arabia
Ras Tanura